Wickham is an unincorporated community in Raleigh County, West Virginia, United States. Its post office is closed.

The community was named after Thomas Wickham, the proprietor of a local mine.

References

Unincorporated communities in Raleigh County, West Virginia
Unincorporated communities in West Virginia
Coal towns in West Virginia